Arnold Worldwide is an American advertising agency headquartered in Boston, Massachusetts. The agency is part of Havas, a global advertising holding company based in France. Some of Arnold's clients include Progressive Insurance, Cox Communications, and AmeriSave.

History 
Arnold Rosoff founded the company in 1946. Upon retirement in 1986, Rosoff sold the agency to his employees. Ed Eskandarian, a former partial-owner of the Boston Red Sox, acquired the agency in 1990 and grew Arnold "through about a dozen acquisitions". One of the most notable deals was the acquisition of  Emerson Lane Fortuna,  an advertising agency with annual billings of $20 million. Eskandarian sold the agency to Snyder Communications in 1995, and Havas acquired Snyder Communications and Arnold in 2000. Eskandarian retired at the end of 2010.

In 2005, Advertising Age ranked Arnold as the 19th largest American agency with revenues of $114m. A year later, Advertising Age listed Arnold Worldwide as the 28th largest American agency with revenues of just under $90m. According to Adweek, Arnold Worldwide's revenue in 2009 was estimated at $235m.

After struggling to gain accounts earlier in the year, Arnold Worldwide won the Panasonic account at the end of 2009. The agency hired Andrew Benett as CEO in February 2010 and had won eighteen new client accounts by the end of the year, earning them the “2010 Comeback Agency of the Year” title from  Ad Age. In 2011, Ad Age chose Arnold as one of 10 agencies to be included on its annual Agency A-List. The Delaney Report, an industry newsletter, declared Arnold Worldwide "Best Ad Agency in the Nation" for the third quarter of 2010 as a result of their "strong new business track record."

In December 2013, Pam Hamlin was named global president of Arnold Worldwide, after having served as president of Arnold's Boston office since 2006.

August 2017, Icaro Doria was named Global Chief Creative Officer, after having served as CCO of DDB New York.

In June 2018, it was announced that Kiran Smith, former marketing chief of Brookstone, would replace Hamlin as CEO.

December 2019, George Sargent, President of Havas Media Boston, was appointed CEO of Arnold Worldwide with Sean McBride assuming the role of chief creative officer.

As part of a larger restructuring, Bre Rossetti was promoted to Chief Strategy Officer; Vallerie Bettini to Chief Client Officer; Julianna Akuamoah to Chief Talent Officer, and Cass Taylor to Chief Operating Officer.

References

External links
Arnold Names New CEO and CCO as Part of Agency Restructuring
www.arn.com

Advertising agencies of the United States
Companies based in Boston
Marketing companies established in 1946
1946 establishments in Massachusetts
Havas
American companies established in 1946